Marcin Tybura (born November 9, 1985) is a Polish professional mixed martial artist. He currently competes in the Heavyweight division for the Ultimate Fighting Championship (UFC). A professional competitor since 2011, Tybura previously fought for M-1 and was an M-1 Global Heavyweight Champion and M-1 Grand Prix 2013 Heavyweight Champion. As of February 14, 2023, he is #10 in the UFC heavyweight rankings.

Early life
Tybura began training in 2006 after a friend introduced him to the sport. Within weeks, he began feeling the urge to compete. However, he would not make his professional debut until several years later.

He earned a Master's degree in Physical Education at the University of Łódź.

Mixed martial arts career

Early career
Tybura made his professional debut on November 5, 2011, against Robert Marcok, whom he beat by a rear-naked choke. He won his next five fights on the Polish MMA circuit, most notably defeating the future UFC heavyweight Adam Wieczorek by a unanimous decision. His last fight at the regional level was a third-round TKO of Krystian Kopytowski at Gladiator Arena 4.

M-1 Global
In 2013, Tybura signed with the Russian based M-1 Global promotion. For his promotional debut, Tybura was scheduled to fight Denis Komkin as a Heavyweight Grand Prix alternate bout. He won the fight by TKO, after Komkin retired from the bout at the end of the first round.

Tybura was then scheduled to fight Chaban Ka at M-1 Challenge 41, in a Heavyweight Grand Prix Semifinal. He beat Ka by a first-round TKO.

In his next two fights, Tybura beat Konstantin Gluhov at M-1 Challenge 42 by rear-naked choke and Maro Perak at M-1 Challenge 47 by a third-round TKO.

At M-1 Challenge 50, Tybura fought Damian Grabowski in the M-1 Heavyweight Grand Prix finals. Tybura submitted Grabowski with a north-south choke 88 seconds into the first round, to become the M-1 Heavyweight champion. He was scheduled to make his first title defense against Denis Smoldarev at M-1 Challenge 53. Tybura successfully defended the title with a first-round submission.

After successfully defending his title, Tybura was scheduled to fight the M-1 Light-heavyweight titleholder Stephan Puetz in a super-fight. The super-fight was contested at heavyweight, with neither of the belts being on the line. Tybura came into the fight with a 10 kilogram weight advantage. Despite winning the first two rounds on the judges' scorecards, Tybura suffered a cut in the third round, which forced the ringside doctor to stop the bout. Tybura suffered the first loss of his professional career, as Puetz was awarded the TKO win.

In his last fight with M-1, Tybura was scheduled to defend his title for the second time against the Croatian heavyweight Ante Delija. The fight ended two minutes into the first round, as Delija suffered a leg break, due to a checked leg kick.

Ultimate Fighting Championship

Tybura signed with the UFC in January 2016.

Tybura made his promotional debut April 10, 2016 against Timothy Johnson at UFC Fight Night 86. He lost the fight via unanimous decision.

Tybura next faced Viktor Pešta on August 6, 2016 at UFC Fight Night 92. He won the fight via KO (head kick), earning a Performance of the Night bonus in the process.

Tybura next fought at UFC 209 on March 4, 2017. He faced Luis Henrique and won the fight via TKO in the third round.

Tybura faced Andrei Arlovski on June 17, 2017 at UFC Fight Night 111. He won the fight by unanimous decision (29–28, 28–27, and 29–27).

Tybura was supposed to face Mark Hunt on November 19, 2017 at UFC Fight Night: Hunt vs. Tybura. On October 11, 2017, Hunt was pulled from the fight by UFC officials citing "medical concerns" on recent Hunt's first person interview statement, and Hunt was replaced by Fabrício Werdum. He lost the fight via unanimous decision.

Tybura faced Derrick Lewis on February 18, 2018 at UFC Fight Night 126. He lost the fight via technical knockout.

Tybura faced Stefan Struve on July 22, 2018 at UFC Fight Night 134. He won the fight via unanimous decision.

Tybura faced Shamil Abdurakhimov on April 20, 2019 at UFC Fight Night 149. He lost the fight via TKO in the second round.

Tybura faced Augusto Sakai on September 14, 2019 at UFC on ESPN+ 16. He lost the fight via knockout in the first round.

Tybura faced Sergey Spivak on February 29, 2020 at UFC Fight Night 169. He won the fight via unanimous decision.

Tybura was expected to face Alexander Romanov on July 11, 2020 at UFC 251. However, Romanov was pulled from the event due to contracting the COVID-19 virus and was replaced by promotional newcomer Maxim Grishin. Tybura won the fight via unanimous decision.

Tybura faced Ben Rothwell on  October 11, 2020 at UFC Fight Night 179. He won the fight via unanimous decision.

Tybura faced Greg Hardy on December 19, 2020 at UFC Fight Night 183. He won the fight in the second round via a technical knockout. This win earned him the Performance of the Night award.

Tybura was scheduled to face Blagoy Ivanov on March 27, 2021 at UFC 260. However, Ivanov was pulled from the bout due to injury. Tybura was then scheduled to face Walt Harris on June 5, 2021 at UFC Fight Night: Rozenstruik vs. Sakai. After surviving an early onslaught from Harris, Tybura took Harris down and finished him with ground and pound. This win earned him the Performance of the Night award.

Tybura faced Alexander Volkov on October 30, 2021 at UFC 267. He lost the bout via unanimous decision.

Tybura was scheduled to face Jairzinho Rozenstruik on February 26, 2022 at UFC Fight Night 202. However, in mid January it was announced the bout was moved to UFC 273 on April 9, 2022. However, the bout was pulled from the card after Tybura withdrew due to an undisclosed illness.

Tybura faced Alexander Romanov on August 20, 2022 at UFC 278. Tybura won the fight via a controversial majority decision. 17 out of 18 media outlets scored the bout a draw.

Tybura faced Blagoy Ivanov on February 4, 2023 at UFC Fight Night 218. He won the fight via unanimous decision.

Championships and achievements

Mixed martial arts
Ultimate Fighting Championship
Performance of the Night (Three times) 
M-1 Global
M-1 2013 Grand Prix Champion (heavyweight)
M-1 Global Heavyweight Champion

Mixed martial arts record

|Win
|align=center|24–7
|Blagoy Ivanov
|Decision (unanimous)
|UFC Fight Night: Lewis vs. Spivak
|
|align=center|3
|align=center|5:00
|Las Vegas, Nevada, United States
|-
|Win
|align=center|23–7
|Alexander Romanov
|Decision (majority)
|UFC 278
|
|align=center|3
|align=center|5:00
|Salt Lake City, Utah, United States
|
|-
|Loss
|align=center|22–7
|Alexander Volkov 
|Decision (unanimous)
|UFC 267 
|
|align=center|3
|align=center|5:00
|Abu Dhabi, United Arab Emirates
|   
|-
|Win
|align=center|22–6
|Walt Harris
|TKO (punches)
|UFC Fight Night: Rozenstruik vs. Sakai
|
|align=center|1
|align=center|4:06
|Las Vegas, Nevada, United States
|
|-
|Win
|align=center|21–6
|Greg Hardy
|TKO (punches)
|UFC Fight Night: Thompson vs. Neal
|
|align=center|2
|align=center|4:31
|Las Vegas, Nevada, United States
|
|-
|Win
|align=center|20–6
|Ben Rothwell
|Decision (unanimous)
|UFC Fight Night: Moraes vs. Sandhagen
|
|align=center|3
|align=center|5:00
|Abu Dhabi, United Arab Emirates
|
|-
|Win
|align=center|19–6
|Maxim Grishin
|Decision (unanimous)
|UFC 251 
|
|align=center|3
|align=center|5:00
|Abu Dhabi, United Arab Emirates
|
|-
|Win
|align=center|18–6
|Sergey Spivak
|Decision (unanimous)
|UFC Fight Night: Benavidez vs. Figueiredo 
|
|align=center|3
|align=center|5:00
|Norfolk, Virginia, United States
|
|-
|Loss
|align=center|17–6
|Augusto Sakai
|KO (punches)
|UFC Fight Night: Cowboy vs. Gaethje 
|
|align=center|1
|align=center|0:59
|Vancouver, British Columbia, Canada
|
|-
|Loss
|align=center|17–5
|Shamil Abdurakhimov
|TKO (punches)
|UFC Fight Night: Overeem vs. Oleinik 
|
|align=center|2
|align=center|3:15
|Saint Petersburg, Russia
|
|-
|Win
|align=center|17–4
|Stefan Struve
|Decision (unanimous)
|UFC Fight Night: Shogun vs. Smith 
|
|align=center|3
|align=center|5:00
|Hamburg, Germany
|
|-
|Loss
|align=center|16–4
|Derrick Lewis
|KO (punches)
|UFC Fight Night: Cowboy vs. Medeiros
|
|align=center|3
|align=center|2:48
|Austin, Texas, United States
|
|-
|Loss
|align=center|16–3
|Fabrício Werdum
|Decision (unanimous)
|UFC Fight Night: Werdum vs. Tybura
|
|align=center|5
|align=center|5:00
|Sydney, Australia
|
|-
|Win
|align=center|16–2
|Andrei Arlovski
|Decision (unanimous)
|UFC Fight Night: Holm vs. Correia
|
|align=center|3
|align=center|5:00
|Kallang, Singapore
|
|-
|Win
|align=center|15–2
|Luis Henrique
|TKO (punches)
|UFC 209
|
|align=center|3
|align=center|3:46
|Las Vegas, Nevada, United States
|
|-
| Win
| align=center| 14–2
| Viktor Pešta
| KO (head kick)
| UFC Fight Night: Rodríguez vs. Caceres
| 
| align=center| 2
| align=center| 0:53
| Salt Lake City, Utah, United States
| 
|-
| Loss
| align=center| 13–2
| Timothy Johnson
| Decision (unanimous)
| UFC Fight Night: Rothwell vs. dos Santos
| 
| align=center| 3
| align=center| 5:00
| Zagreb, Croatia
|
|-
| Win
| align=center| 13–1
| Ante Delija
| TKO (leg injury)
| M-1 Challenge 61: Battle of Narts
| 
| align=center| 1
| align=center| 2:21
| Nazran, Russia
|
|-
| Loss
| align=center| 12–1
| Stephan Puetz
| TKO (doctor stoppage)
| M-1 Challenge 57: Battle in the Heart of the Continent
| 
| align=center| 3
| align=center| 3:48
| Orenburg, Russia
| 
|-
| Win
| align=center| 12–0
| Denis Smoldarev
| Submission (rear-naked choke)
| M-1 Challenge 53: Battle in the Celestial Empire
| 
| align=center| 1
| align=center| 3:35
| Beijing, China
|
|-
| Win
| align=center| 11–0
| Damian Grabowski
| Technical Submission (north-south choke)
| M-1 Challenge 50: Battle of Neva
| 
| align=center| 1
| align=center| 1:28
| Saint Petersburg, Russia
| 
|-
| Win
| align=center| 10–0
| Maro Perak
| TKO (punches)
| M-1 Global: M-1 Challenge 47
| 
| align=center| 3
| align=center| 3:26
| Orenburg, Russia
| 
|-
| Win
| align=center| 9–0
| Konstantin Gluhov
| Submission (rear-naked choke)
| M-1 Global: M-1 Challenge 42
| 
| align=center| 1
| align=center| 4:30
| Saint Petersburg, Russia
|
|-
| Win
| align=center| 8–0
| Chaban Ka
| TKO (punches)
| M-1 Global: M-1 Challenge 41
| 
| align=center| 1
| align=center| 2:05
| Saint Petersburg, Russia
|
|-
| Win
| align=center| 7–0
| Denis Komkin
| TKO (retirement)
| M-1 Challenge 37: Khamanaev vs. Puhakka
| 
| align=center| 1
| align=center| 5:00
| Orenburg, Russia
|
|-
| Win
| align=center| 6–0
| Krystian Kopytowski
| TKO (retirement)
| Gladiator Arena 4
| 
| align=center| 3
| align=center| 1:53
| Pyrzyce, Poland
| 
|-
| Win
| align=center| 5–0
| Szymon Bajor
| Decision (split)
| Prime FC 1: Bajor vs. Tybura
| 
| align=center| 3
| align=center| 5:00
| Mielec, Poland
| 
|-
| Win
| align=center| 4–0
| Andrzej Kosecki
| Submission (rear-naked choke)
| OEF: Carphatian Primus Belt Round 2
| 
| align=center| 1
| align=center| 3:17
| Rzeszów, Poland
| 
|-
| Win
| align=center| 3–0
| Stanisław Ślusakowicz
| Submission (triangle armbar)
| OEF: Carphatian Primus Belt Round 1
| 
| align=center| 1
| align=center| 3:20
| Rzeszów, Poland
| 
|-
| Win
| align=center| 2–0
| Adam Wieczorek
| Decision (unanimous)
| Polish MMA Championships Finals
| 
| align=center| 2
| align=center| 5:00
| Chorzów, Poland
| 
|-
| Win
| align=center| 1–0
| Robert Marcok
| Submission (rear-naked choke)
| Polish MMA Championships Finals
| 
| align=center| 1
| align=center| 3:48
| Chorzów, Poland
| 
|-

See also
List of current UFC fighters
List of male mixed martial artists

References

External links

Polish male mixed martial artists
Heavyweight mixed martial artists
Mixed martial artists utilizing Brazilian jiu-jitsu
People from Poddębice County
Polish practitioners of Brazilian jiu-jitsu
People awarded a black belt in Brazilian jiu-jitsu
1985 births
Living people
Ultimate Fighting Championship male fighters